Charlotte Weidler (1895–1983) was a German art dealer, curator and art historian. Her dealings concerning artworks from the collections of Paul Westheim and Alfred Flechtheim during the Nazi–era have been the focus of several high-profile lawsuits.

Early activities 
Weidler was born in Berlin and dealt in modern art. Initially a close friend of the German Jewish art collector and editor of Das Kunstblatt, Paul Westheim, she later betrayed him. The exact nature of her actions regarding Westheim's art collection has been the subject of much controversy, generating lawsuits, book and articles and speculation as to her motivations.

Curator at the Carnegie Institute of Art 
Weidler began working as a curator for the Carnegie Institute in Pittsburgh while she was still in Berlin and continued after she emigrated to the United States in 1939, traveling between the two countries for work. She made the acquaintance of the Pittsburg steel magnate G. David Thompson and helped him build his collection. selected art to acquire and was responsible for bringing numerous important artworks into American museums. Reputed to be an important expert in German modern art. Weidler's correspondence with the Carnegie is considered to provide "unique insight and detail about the situation of artists in Nazi Germany" and that her exchanges with Carnegie president Homer St. Gaudens  are "an extraordinary source of information for provenance researchers about the location of artwork pre-war and the changing attitude towards modern art in Germany as the Nazis rose to power.".

Controversies and lawsuits 
Weidler's friend, the Jewish art collector Paul Westheim fled Nazi Germany for Paris in 1933, leaving his important art collection in Weidler's care. After initially helping him, she cut off contact and, at end of World War II, she told Westheim that his paintings had been lost or destroyed. However this turned out not to be true, as  after Westheim's death, Weidler began selling the very same paintings. Eventually someone who recognised one of the paintings informed Westheim's surviving family, who sued. In 2013, Westheim's daughter Margit Frenk filed a lawsuit demanded the return of four paintings estimated to be worth more than three million dollars, including Max Pechstein's "Portrait of Paul Westheim" and a watercolor by Paul Klee.

Weidler also claimed that the famous German Jewish dealer Alfred Flechtheim bequeathed paintings to her, but this assertion was also contested in several lawsuits. In 2009, the family of the deceased artist Georg Grosz filed a claim against the Museum of Modern Art for the return of three paintings that  Charlotte Weidler had sold to the MoMa saying that Grosz's art dealer Alfred Flechtheim had gifted them to her. The Grosz family criticized Weidler's account as false, submitting evidence that the paintings had transited through a Dutch auction house Mak Van Waay known for dealing in looted art. Weidler's testimony played a crucial role in the lawsuit.

Some historians have tried to explain Weidler's actions as the result of a frustrated love affair with Westheim.

Weidler also played a role in dealing with the property of the photographer (Else) Neulander Simon. Persecuted as a Jew, Simon was "forced to hand the (photography) studio over to her friend Charlotte Weider.” Simon was deported to the concentration camp at Majdanek-Lubin and died in 1944.

Notable artworks 

Notable works that Weidler sold as her own include George Grosz' work, Portrait of the Poet Herrmann-Neisse (1927); Self-Portrait with a Model; and Republican Automatons.

References

Women art historians
German art curators
1895 births
1983 deaths
People from Berlin
German emigrants to the United States
German art historians
Art and cultural repatriation after World War II
American women curators
American curators
German women curators